Eckernforde Tanga University (ETU) is a  private university in Tanga, Tanzania.

References

External links
 

Private universities in Tanzania
Universities in Tanga
Educational institutions established in 2010
2010 establishments in Tanzania